Eric Reynolds may refer to:

Eric Reynolds (comics), American cartoonist, critic and comics editor 
Eric Reynolds (fighter) (born 1986), American mixed martial arts fighter
Eric Reynolds (visual effects), Academy Award nominated visual effects supervisor